Careston railway station served the hamlet of Careston, Angus, Scotland, from 1895 to 1964 on the Forfar and Brechin Railway.

History 
The station was opened on 1 June 1895 by the Caledonian Railway. On the westbound platform was the station building,    to the south was the goods yard and at the west end of the westbound platform was the signal box. The station closed to passengers on 4 August 1952 and closed to goods on 7 September 1964.

References 

Disused railway stations in Angus, Scotland
Former Caledonian Railway stations
Railway stations in Great Britain opened in 1895
Railway stations in Great Britain closed in 1952
1895 establishments in Scotland
1964 disestablishments in Scotland